Russkiye Vedomosti was a Russian liberal daily newspaper, published in Moscow from 1863 till 1918.

Founded in Moscow in 1863 by Nikolai Pavlov, it was edited by Nikolai Skvortsov (1866-1882) and by Vasily  Sobolevsky, in 1882-1912. After Sobolevsky's death in 1912, it became the organ of the Right-Wing Kadets. It was suppressed by the Bolsheviks in March 1918, for publishing the article by Boris Savinkov called "On Arrival" (С дороги). For it, its last editor P.V. Egorov had to spend three months in jail.

External links 
"Russkiye Vedomosti" digital archives in "Newspapers on the web and beyond", the digital resource of the National Library of Russia

References

Defunct newspapers published in Russia
Newspapers published in the Russian Empire
Publications established in 1863
Publications disestablished in 1918
Newspapers published in Moscow